Sindh Tourism Development Corporation (STDC) is an organization of the Government of Sindh, Pakistan. STDC is governed by the Board of directors and provides facilities to the national and international tourists. It runs several motels and resorts across the Sindh province. STDC was incorporated on June 5, 1992.

The corporation was formed to develop and promote tourism in Sindh, using its geographical assets, its ancient history, its Sufi heritage, its archaeology, its creative and performing arts, and its literature.

Motels and resorts

See also

 Pakistan Tourism Development Corp

References

External links
 STDC official website

Tourism in Sindh
Sindh
Government-owned companies of Pakistan
Hospitality companies of Pakistan
Tourism agencies
Economy of Sindh